The 1994–95 Purdue Boilermakers men's basketball team represented Purdue University as a member of the Big Ten Conference during the 1994–95 NCAA Division I men's basketball season. The team was led by Gene Keady and played its home games at Mackey Arena.

Roster

Schedule and results

|-
!colspan=9 style=| Non-conference regular season

|-
!colspan=9 style=| Big Ten regular season

|-
!colspan=9 style=| NCAA Tournament

Rankings

Team players drafted into the NBA

See also
1995 NCAA Division I men's basketball tournament
List of NCAA Division I institutions

References

Purdue Boilermarkers
Purdue Boilermakers men's basketball seasons
Purd
Purd
Purdue